It's Good to Be Me! is the first EP by the Spanish rock band Dover. It was released on 8 July 2002 through EMI Odeon and Chrysalis Records. It contains one unreleased song, five live versions (recorded on 19 May 2002 in Getafe, Madrid) and two acoustic versions.

Track listing 
Lyrics and music by Amparo Llanos and Cristina Llanos except for the Screaming Trees song "Witness" that was composed by Van Conner, Gary Lee Conner, and Mark Lanegan.

Personnel 
Dover
 Cristina Llanos – vocals and acoustic guitar
 Amparo Llanos – guitar
 Álvaro Díez – bass guitar
 Jesús Antúnez – drums

References

External links 
 

2002 EPs
Dover (band) EPs